Serifo Soares Cassamá  (born 29 August 1966) is a retired Bissau-Guinean football midfielder.

References

1966 births
Living people
Bissau-Guinean footballers
Leça F.C. players
Association football midfielders
Primeira Liga players
Bissau-Guinean expatriate footballers
Expatriate footballers in Portugal
Bissau-Guinean expatriate sportspeople in Portugal